The Heroic Age of American Invention is a science book for children by L. Sprague de Camp, published by Doubleday in 1961. It was reprinted in 1993 by Barnes & Noble under the alternate title The Heroes of American Invention. The book has been translated in Portuguese.

Summary
By "heroic age" the author means the era of American history in which individual initiative and enterprise constituted the primary thread in technical innovation, roughly from the early 19th century until mass production and corporate enterprise outpaced that of the individual around the time of World War I. The story of innovation is told through the biographies and inventions of thirty-two key inventors of the United States' industrial revolution, whom de Camp feels were pivotal in converting the country from an agrarian nation to an industrial one.

Some of the inventors spotlighted include Robert L. Stevens, George Westinghouse, Joseph Henry, Samuel Morse, Samuel Colt, Hiram Stevens Maxim, Hudson Maxim, Cyrus McCormick, John Ericsson, William Kelly, Ottmar Mergenthaler, Christopher Latham Sholes, Alexander Graham Bell, Thomas Edison, Elihu Thomson, Nikola Tesla, George Baldwin Selden, Samuel Pierpoint Langley, Wilbur Wright, Orville Wright, Reginald Aubrey Fessenden, Lee de Forest, and Edwin Howard Armstrong.

Contents
I. Invention Comes to America
II. The Heroic Age Begins
III. The Stevenses and Railroading
IV. Henry, Morse, and the Telegraph
V. Colt and Other Gunmakers
VI. McCormick and Farm Machinery
VII. Ericsson and the Modern Warship
VIII. Kelly and Steel Refining
IX. Mergenthaler, Sholes, and Writing Machines
X. Bell and the Telephone
XI. Edison and the Electric Light
XII. Thomson and Alternating-Current Power
XIII. Selden and the Automobile
XIV. Langley, The Wrights, and Flying
XV. Fessenden, De Forest, and Radio
XVI. The End of the Heroic Age
Notes
Bibliography
Index

References

1961 children's books
Children's non-fiction books
Technology books
Books by L. Sprague de Camp
Doubleday (publisher) books
History of science and technology in the United States
American children's books